is a fictional character in Capcom's Street Fighter series. First appearing in Street Fighter III: New Generation in 1997, she is a young prodigy ninja-in-training from an ancient clan, but who nevertheless would prefer to live the normal life of a modern Japanese teenager. Ibuki has a pet raccoon dog named Don. She is depicted as a close friend to Sakura, and her friendly rivals include R. Mika. She has also appeared in other games and her own comic book miniseries.

Ibuki was originally designed by Kinu Nishimura, and has been voiced by Yuri Amano, Ayumi Fujimura and Kana Ueda in Japanese and by Kat Steel and Cristina Vee in English. Her unique, technical and tricky moveset relies on mobility, aggressiveness and deception to be most effective, making her hard to master but favored among top players. Ibuki has become one of the most popular women in the Street Fighter series, being also regarded by some as one of the top ninja characters in all video games.

Background
Although trained in ninjutsu since infancy, with continuous rigorous training and special missions, Ibuki is otherwise an ordinary high-school student with an attraction to pop idols. She yearns to be more carefree, and prefers schoolgirl attire over her traditional ninja outfit, which she considers ugly. In battle, she uses taijutsu, a fighting style that combines several Japanese martial arts. Ibuki is 162 cm tall and weighs 46 kg, her measurements are B95 / W57 / H90, and her birthday is on December 6.

Ibuki has a pet tanuki (Japanese raccoon dog) named  / , who has been with her since her childhood and has learnt to use ninja techniques himself. Ibuki's friend, appearing in her endings in the original Street Fighter III: New Generation and in Street Fighter III: 2nd Impact, as well in some other games, is a ninja named , who hails in the same village and attends the same high-school class. The young boy who spars with Ibuki before a match in 3rd Strike is named . It was rumored that original Street Fighter character Geki was her father, but this was never confirmed as canon.

Appearances

Video games

Street Fighter
Ibuki and Elena had been the only women fighters in the Street Fighter III sub-series until they were joined by Makoto and Chun-Li in Street Fighter III: 3rd Strike (1999). In the plots of the original Street Fighter III and 2nd Impact, Ibuki is sent by her clan to retrieve a mysterious "G file" from Gill's organization, the Illuminati. In Ibuki's game end sequence, Gill hands her the file after their battle. In 3rd Strike, Ibuki shares a special pre-fight introductory sequence with her rival Makoto. She is shown preparing to graduate from high school and is studying for her college application exams, hoping to move away from home to enjoy a normal campus life and find a boyfriend. As part of her final exam, Ibuki is sent to find and defeat the elderly martial arts legend named Oro. In her 3rd Strike ending she is accepted into the fictional , at first without knowledge of its cover for an elite ninja training camp.

A kunai resembling her is seen in Fei Long's ending in Street Fighter IV (2008). She was later revealed to be playable in Super Street Fighter IV (2010), where her introductory sequence shows her interacting with a fellow Capcom ninja Guy for the first time. Her story for the game depicts her looking for fun and boys to date. Ibuki also meets Sakura Kasugano, as she tries to get Sakura to introduce her to a boy.

Ibuki reappears as a playable character in Street Fighter V as one of the DLC characters released after the game's launch. She was supposed to arrive in May 2016 but was delayed to July. In her prologue story, Ibuki finally finishes her ninja assignment and is informed by her friend Sakura about the party invitation sent from her rival Karin Kanzuki. Arriving at the Kanzuki Estate, Ibuki fights and defeat Birdie and Karin. After the fight, Karin lets her stay at the party with handsome boys and gives her the contract which has been approved by the Shinobi village to work with her. Ibuki also appears in the end of R. Mika's prologue story, rejecting her offer in muscle training which angers R. Mika who beats her in a fight. Ibuki and R. Mika continue to argue and bicker through the course of the game's main story, "A Shadow Falls", which begins when they and Karin travel to the New York City to find out who is behind the activation of the seven Black Moons, eventually finding out it is a Shadaloo plot. During the first infiltration of the Shadaloo base, Ibuki fights Balrog but fails to beat him. She then uses her smoke bomb to distract the enemies and the two successfully escape with it until they reunited with Karin. They witness Zangief beat Abel, Ibuki watching in disgust while R. Mika idolizes him. In the final assault against Shadaloo, Ibuki and R. Mika fight off Shadaloo soldiers. Ibuki is last seen watching Shadaloo's destruction with the other fighters.

Other games
A super deformed version of Ibuki is a playable character in the fighting game Super Gem Fighter Mini Mix / Pocket Fighter (1997), in which she sneaks off from her ninja training for an ice cream in Tokyo.  Ibuki is playable in the mobile puzzle game Street Fighter: Puzzle Spirits (2014), and appears as a card in the browser-based social game Onimusha Soul (2012) and in person in Street Fighter Battle Combination (2015). Her cards also appear in SNK vs. Capcom: Card Fighters Clash (1999) and SNK vs. Capcom: Card Fighters DS (2007). She has a cameo in Capcom Fighting Evolution / Capcom Fighting Jam (2004).

Ibuki is one of the characters representing the Street Fighter series in the crossover fighting game, Street Fighter X Tekken (2012), with Rolento as her tag team partner. In it, she is persuaded by her village leaders to accept Rolento's request for a joint mission to the South Pole, serving as his advisor on infiltration. In the story mode, Rolento initially addresses the very annoyed Ibuki as private but "promotes" her to the rank of sergeant by the end of the game. According to a backstory for the Street Fighter X Tekken DLC ninja costume-swap for the Tekken series' Asuka Kazama, Asuka was sent Ibuki's village to learn the ninja arts from her. Ibuki's own Tekken swap costume is in the style of Yoshimitsu, with her latest assignment having her join his Manji Clan.

Producer/director Ryota Niitsuma originally considered her for inclusion as a playable character in Tatsunoko vs. Capcom: Ultimate All-Stars (2008), but she was ultimately cut due to time constraints. The "head student at Ibuki's ninja village" was supposed to be a new player character in the rejected concept of Street Fighter IV Flashback by Backbone Entertainment, which would also have feature a cameo of a much younger version of Ibuki.

Design

The character that became Ibuki has been originally conceived as a ninja boy before the gender was swapped, and the male version's design might have been re-used for Ibuki's sparring partner Yūta Homura. Street Fighter III producer Tomoshi Sadamoto recalled that while Ibuki was the first "real" ninja character (unlike Vega), in her case they did not have a problem with finding reference materials in Japan, as they did with African fighter Elena. However, "the difficult thing about making Ibuki was putting her hair together" as "she had 1.2 to 1.3x the character data, compared to the other characters." The task of attaching her hair parts took several months to complete, with Sadamoto himself doing this work in the end.

Super Street Fighter IV main battle planner said Ibuki is an "orthodox ninja at first glance, but her character is one of a normal girl, so we are trying to bring out her feminine side in her lines and dialogue as well as in her proportions." The game's director said she was probably the most difficult character to make while trying to best show "her charm, even behind the mask," as "Ibuki is cute even at a first glance, so that might be what you focus on, but we've also put a lot of effort into her motions and her design." Ibuki's English voice actress Kat Steel, hired for her knowledge of the character displayed during the audition, wrote it "was a treat because her character is sassy, mischievous, and oh so girlish!" For Street Fighter X Tekken, Capcom abortively planned to give Ibuki some attacks featuring Don.

Ibuki's build is depicted as slim and athletic, with black hair held tightly back in a topknot ponytail that drops well beneath her waist. Her usual fighting outfit, in which she has appeared in most of the games, is a type of ninja dogi, consisting of a sleeveless upper garment, baggy pants slit at the sides (for easy movement), arm guards, and a mask that conceals the lower half of her face. Her footwear consists only of cloth bandages wrapped around her shins, ankles and instep. Ibuki's alternative, everyday costume is a blue-and-white Japanese schoolgirl uniform, or casual clothes—in the same color scheme—with a chain of miniature kunai knives and a fake tanuki tail, introduced in Super Street Fighter IV Arcade Edition. Her Street Fighter III ending's original schoolgirl costume has been by re-used by the Rival Schools designer Hideaki Itsuno for this game's character Hinata Wakaba because he thought it was "cute". One of her scrapped costume concepts for Super Street Fighter IV was a very distinct, partially armored ninja outfit, which was more skimpy and featured two Japanese swords on her back.

After nearly two decades, Ibuki was radically redesigned for Street Fighter V, where her main costume changes to a modified version of her schoolgirl outfit (originally from her Street Fighter III ending) with above-knee-high socks mixed with a black mask and purple elements of traditional Japanese armour on her hands and legs. Before deciding on it, the designers tried many different costume ideas by adjusting the ratio of her two personalities; the rejected concept art sketches (including one with full tanuki suit) were posted on Capcom's blog. Ibuki's premium summer costume is a similarly armored swimsuit, with partial leggings and a cape-like face scarf resembling this of Capcom's own Strider Hiryu, which comes in a variety of colors. Her premium battle costume is an altogether different and more fashionable blue ninja outfit with a floral theme with a sword on her back, where for the first time she has loose hair, described as  an "outfit that's very fitting for a kunoichi, but the short bangs cut makes her look younger." Her Street Fighter III look returned in the "nostalgic costumes" DLC and a 30th Anniversary event gave her a traditional Japanese clothing.

Gameplay
According to Computer and Video Games, Ibuki appeared "to be one of the most powerful and most popular character" in Street Fighter III. VentureBeats Chris Hoadley opined Ibuki was the strongest character in Street Fighter III: 2nd Impact and GameSpot felt her to be, in terms of gameplay, most similar to Cammy and Geki. According to UGO, Ibuki in Street Fighter III "has the strength and speed to face off against any top-tier character", as she is "quick, somewhat unpredictable and easy to pick up", and "she's just as likely to attack an opponent from the front as she is to dash into the air and rain down several kunai. It's this type of diversity in fighting that makes her attractive to players." Retro Gamer opined "this female ninja is fast, mobile and can stun opponents quickly. While she loses in a toe-to-toe brawl against most characters, she has plenty of trickery to get around a tight defence and dictate the match."

In Super Street Fighter IV, the developers attempted to retain Ibuki's playstyle and feel from Street Fighter III. She was given a super jump (the only character, other than C. Viper, to have one in this game) and made adjustments to have combos that utilize it. Capcom's Taketoshi Sano said that "Ibuki is suited to those who want to get the most out of a single character" and "beginners can use her too, but if I had to pick I'd say she's suited for intermediate." Capcom Europe described Ibuki's "Raida" ("Thunder Strike") command grab as having some unique properties and being one of the most powerful moves in the game. According to an MTV guide, Ibuki is "one of the hardest characters to master in this latest iteration" and players need to gain "a strong understanding of each character's moves and abilities before truly coming to grips with what the weak, yet versatile Ibuki has to offer."

In a guide to Super Street Fighter IV: 3D Edition, GameSpy stated that Ibuki has "got some unique strengths and enough versatility that we think she can cope with most opponents. Her damage is a bit lacking, but with enough craftiness in your execution you can make up for it." Listing the biggest mistakes to avoid in the game, GamesRadar advised Ibuki's players to not overuse her "kunai air-knives", but to rather use them sparingly in not predictably as a tool to help get close to the opponent. According to GamesRadar, "Ibuki makes up for her relatively weak damage by having some of the trickiest mobility in the game, letting a skilled player dash circles around their confused opponent." According to Edge, Ultra Street Fighter IV'''s addition of delayed wakeup, which lets one stay on the floor longer after being knocked down to put an opponent off their rhythm, was "primarily designed to nerf characters like Cammy, Akuma and Ibuki who are at their most effective when an opponent is getting up off the ground." Professional player Sakonoko, whose preferred character in Super Street Fighter IV was Ibuki, said in interview for Famitsu that Ibuki in Street Fighter X Tekken "is ultimately based on her SSFIV Arcade Edition version" and so it is easy for people familiar with this game "to jump right in." He noted a few character-specific changes between these games, such as Ibuki's kunai attacks gaining the knock-down ability.

In her Street Fighter V incarnation, Ibuki's playstyle is different from in Street Fighter IV, becoming a "resource-heavy" character. She has gained new special moves such as to dodge-teleport, glide (the "flying squirrel technique"), and throw bombs with different fuses. According to Capcom, "Ibuki has always been a very mobile character with various target combos, but she now has even more ways to mix-up the opponent with the ability to glide through the air and toss out ninja bombs, making it very difficult to predict where she will land and where her next attack will come from. Kunais have also been a cornerstone of her playstyle, but now players will have to be much more strategic in their use as she can only stock five at a time before she has to quickly obtain another set." Ibuki placed third in the 2016 EventHubs user poll for the best mix-up play ability in the game. Following the "nerfing" of Chun-Li in the Season 2 of Street Fighter V: Arcade Edition in 2017, the enhanced Ibuki became the chosen character for a number of top professional players, including Ho Kun Xian (credited by Capcom with starting the "Ibuki revolution" so that "by late 2017 Ibuki is a pretty common character to see among high level play") and Atsushi Fujimura (who abandoned Nash).

Other appearances
Comics

Ibuki appears in Street Fighter comic books, including in Street Fighter: Unlimited. Notably she received her own four-issue miniseries  Street Fighter Legends: Ibuki, written by Jim Zubkavich and drawn by Omar Dogan. It was published by UDON Entertainment in 2010 to coincide with the release of Super Street Fighter IV. One alternative cover was drawn by Adam Warren and the entire miniseries was later included in the compilation Street Fighter Legends: The Ultimate Edition. In Ibuki, the character's fictional background was revealed: she had been destined to become a perfect assassin for the Geki clan (in to the comic, Geki is not an individual person but a clan that is rival to Ibuki's), but one of them, Enjō, fled with the baby. She also interacts with Elena, in addition to Makoto and Sarai.

For writing Ibuki, Zubkavich was nominated for a Joe Shuster Award. He said that, compared to Sakura, "Ibuki's a more complex character, more flawed. She's a great ninja but she isn't even sure this is what she wants out of life. (...) Sakura's never-give-up attitude may be more of a classic anime archetype, but I feel Ibuki's a character more people can empathize with." He added, "Ibuki’s personality has been limited to game endings and oh-so brief lines of dialogue from her victory quotes, so expanding upon those with this focused story is an honour and a challenge." In a poll by Omar Dogan on his DeviantArt website, most of voters wanted to see Ibuki "wearing something cute", and precisely something in the Harajuku-style Lolita fashion. Dogan's own favourite part of the story was "the part where Ibuki and Oro battle."

Other
Ibuki is a favored character for use in promotional artwork, and has a number of figurines and action figures made in her image. These include figures from Kotobukiya and Capcom itself, including one designed by Street Fighter III character concept artist Kinu Nishimura.

Ibuki's Xbox Live Avatar costume was released in 2010 and her cards are featured in the card game Universal Fighting System. In a cameo appearance, Sakura is shown controlling Ibuki within a handheld Street Fighter III in one scene in the anime film Street Fighter Alpha: The Animation. 

Reception

Ibuki was met with a positive critical and fan reception regarding her character design, attractiveness and personality, and with a mixed reception regarding her gameplay issues, especially regarding her initial appearance in Street Fighter III. Despite her debut in a relatively obscure entry in the series, Ibuki has become a popular Street Fighter character. Prior to the release of Street Fighter III, Electronic Gaming Monthly predicted, "She will certainly be one of the new favorite fighters, since her balance of offense and defense is very well done." Capcom producer Yoshinori Ono said Ibuki is so "popular because she is insanely fun to play." Professional Street Fighter commentator and player Femi Adeboye (F-Word) recalled Ibuki in Third Strike has changed his life when he was a young teenager: "I saw this ninja girl and I picked her up, that became my destiny." In 2002, she was voted the 12th most popular Street Fighter character in Capcom's own poll for the 15th anniversary of Street Fighter. Street Fighter IV director Takashi Tsukamoto described her as "a character that many people were waiting for;" a teaser trailer suggesting her inclusion in the game, revealed by Yoshinori Ono at the Evolution Championship Series 2011 tournament event, excited the crowd. Ibuki was voted the 16th most requested Street Fighter side character to be added to the roster of Tekken X Street Fighter in an official poll by Namco in 2013. In a 2018 worldwide poll by Capcom, Ibuki was voted 31st most popular Street Fighter character (out of 109).

Previewing Street Fighter III, Computer and Video Games highlighted Ibuki and Necro as "two of the finest" fighters in the game. In 2008, GameDaily placed Ibuki 15th on its list of top Street Fighter characters of all time, expressing surprise that "all she wants to do is live a normal life." That same year, IGNs D. F. Smith ranked her as the 22nd top Street Fighter character and the only ninja on their list. In 2015, Ben Lee from Digital Spy ranked the "fast, relentless, kick-ass, and often unpredictable" Ibuki as the 12th best Street Fighter character. IGNs Jesse Schedeen featured her among the characters he wanted to appear in Street Fighter IV. GamesRadars Mikel Reparaz similarly listed Ibuki among the 12 characters he would like to see in Super Street Fighter IV despite her being "one of the weaker characters" in Street Fighter III, citing her "enduring popularity", "rapid, skill-centric combos and high-flying special moves" and her costume "which leaves her hips conspicuously bare and devoid of any sign of underpants." Martin Robinson of AskMen too named Ibuki as of the five characters it wished to be included in Super Street Fighter IV, writing that "ninjas might be ten-a-penny in videogames, but none are as effortlessly cool as Ibuki" and adding that she "makes this list primarily for her style" but is "no slouch in combat either." According to the GameZone review of the game, "it’s unfathomable to think that anyone could not fall in love with Ibuki and Makoto, introduced in Street Fighter III, all over again." In his review of Super Street Fighter IV, Tim Higgins from The Telegraph wrote Ibuki was his personal favourite new fighter in the game for "all slippery evasive manoeuvres and devastating bread and butter combos." GamesRadars Lucas Sullivan called her inclusion in Street Fighter IV "a stroke of genius" and requested her return in Street Fighter V.

Capcom's Taisaku Okada said Ibuki was the most popular of the Street Fighter III women characters, probably because of her appearance contrasting a young girl "of the current times" with "this old-time ninja look". Nevertheless, MTV's Brad Nicholson blamed Ibuki's "bland, tan, and masked getup that hasn’t changed much since her days in Street Fighter III," for her not appearing on the cover of Super Street Fighter IV despite all her "ravenous fans." Giovanni Simotti, designer of Akane the Kunoichi, intended look of the titular character on the game's cover as "a small tribute to two of the most famous kunoichi from the history of the videogames – a mix of Mai Shiranui with a bit of Ibuki." In 2012, Gelo Gonzales of FHM included Ibuki among the nine "sexiest ninja babes in games" and compared her to Sam Pinto. GamesRadars Sullivan compared the Killer Instinct 3 character Sadira to Ibuki, as similarly being "an agile fighter who can orchestrate a lot of very tricky setups from the air."

In 2004, Nich Maragos and David Smith of 1UP.com ranked Ibuki as the sixth overall best ninja character in video games, calling her "one of the coolest-looking characters" in Street Fighter III but "also one of the least capable in competition." That same year, Aubrey Sitterson of UGO featured her on a list of the 25 "foxiest fighting females to ever be pixelated" and commented that Ibuki is "not only super-hot, but she's also a ninja, which is like a 'chocolate in my peanut butter' situation." UGOs Paul Furfari further stated that she "set the new standard in female fighters," adding, "forget Chun-Li". GameZone included the "amazing" Ibuki in their 2011 list of "best video game ninjas" and stated: "We’re glad she’s still a staple in this series to this very day – but when is she going to come over to Marvel vs. Capcom territory?" Márcio Pacheco Alexsandro of Brazil's Game Hall placed her at tenth spot of his 2014 list of top kunoichi characters in games, opining that she is "far from having such status as Chun-Li, but has her charm, especially if you like Japanese schoolgirls." In 2016, Steven Hanson from Destructoid described her as "everybody's favorite schoolgirl ninja." A poll for the most erotic girl in the history of fighting games conducted by Japanese web portal Goo had Ibuki and Ayane, a school-aged ninja from Dead or Alive'', share the 11th/12th place (out of 50 contesters) in 2016; she was voted ninth in 2018.

See also
List of Street Fighter characters
Maki Genryusai
Ninja in popular culture

References

External links
Official websites: Street Fighter IV, Street Fighter V

Female characters in video games
Fictional female ninja
Fictional martial artists in video games
Fictional taijutsuka
Fictional Japanese people in video games
Ninja characters in video games
Street Fighter characters
Teenage characters in video games
Woman soldier and warrior characters in video games
Video game characters introduced in 1997
Video game characters who can teleport
Video game characters who can move at superhuman speeds